The Mape River is a river located in the Morobe Province of Papua New Guinea.

Rivers of Papua New Guinea
Morobe Province